Vale da Porca is a Portuguese parish located in the municipality of Macedo de Cavaleiros (Bragança District). The population in 2011 was 286, in an area of 17.43 km².

References

Freguesias of Macedo de Cavaleiros